The Fredericksburg in the Texas Hill Country AVA  is an American Viticultural Area surrounding the town of Fredericksburg, Texas in the Texas Hill Country. 
  
Fredericksburg and the surrounding area were settled by German immigrants in the nineteenth century. These settlers were the first to cultivate grapevines in the Texas Hill Country.

See also
 Texas wine

References

External links
  

American Viticultural Areas
Texas Hill Country
Texas wine
Regions of Texas
Geography of Gillespie County, Texas
Fredericksburg, Texas
1988 establishments in Texas